The Lafayette Township School District is a comprehensive community public school district that serves students in kindergarten through eighth grade from Lafayette Township, in Sussex County, New Jersey, United States.

As of the 2018–19 school year, the district, comprised of one school, had an enrollment of 204 students and 22.7 classroom teachers (on an FTE basis), for a student–teacher ratio of 9.0:1.

The district is classified by the New Jersey Department of Education as being in District Factor Group "GH", the third-highest of eight groupings. District Factor Groups organize districts statewide to allow comparison by common socioeconomic characteristics of the local districts. From lowest socioeconomic status to highest, the categories are A, B, CD, DE, FG, GH, I and J.

For ninth through twelfth grades, public school students attend High Point Regional High School, which also serves students from Branchville, Frankford Township, Montague Township, Sussex Borough and Wantage Township (where the school is located). As of the 2018–19 school year, the high school had an enrollment of 893 students and 81.9 classroom teachers (on an FTE basis), for a student–teacher ratio of 10.9:1.

Schools
Schools in the district (with 2018–19 enrollment data from the National Center for Education Statistics) are:
Elementary schools 
Lafayette Township Elementary School with 203 students in grades PreK-8
Gerard Fazzio, Assistant Principal

Administration
Core members of the district's administration are:
Jennifer Cenatiempo, Superintendent
Erin Siipola, Business Administrator / Board Secretary

Board of education
The district's board of education, comprised of nine members, sets policy and oversees the fiscal and educational operation of the district through its administration. As a Type II school district, the board's trustees are elected directly by voters to serve three-year terms of office on a staggered basis, with three seats up for election each year held (since 2012) as part of the November general election. The board appoints a superintendent to oversee the day-to-day operation of the district.

References

External links
Lafayette Township School District

School Data for the Lafayette Township School District, National Center for Education Statistics
High Point Regional High School

Lafayette Township, New Jersey
New Jersey District Factor Group GH
School districts in Sussex County, New Jersey
Public K–8 schools in New Jersey